Werner Coetser (born 2 March 1988), is a South African actor, producer, presenter, voice artist, MC and singer. He is best known for the role "Bernard Jordaan" in the television soap opera 7de Laan.

Personal life
He was born on 2 March 1988 in South Africa. In 2009, he trained as Tuks at BaDa.

He is married and the couple has two children.

Career
In 2010, he made his film debut with Susanna Van Biljon and played the role of "Hennie". In 2010, he made his maiden television acting with the serial 7de Laan where he played the role of "Bernard Jordaan". The serial made his turning point of the career, where he played the role for five consecutive years until 2015. In 2016, he joined with the serial Gertroud Met Rugby and played the role of "Blitz". Apart from television and cinema, Coetser also made sporadic appearances in stage plays including; Boeing Boeing, Huis Toe and Vaselintjie.

Filmography

References

External links
 

Living people
South African male television actors
1988 births